96th Foot may refer to:

 96th Regiment of Foot, created from the 2nd battalion of the 52nd (Oxfordshire) Regiment of Foot in 1803 and renumbered 95th Foot in 1816, disbanded in 1818
 96th Regiment of Foot, raised as the Minorca Regiment in 1798, given the name 97th (Queen's Own Germans) in 1805, and renumbered as the 96th in 1816

See also 
 List of Regiments of Foot, mid-18th century–1881